The Silberberg ("silver mountain"), at , (along with the Spießhorn,) is the most prominent summit in the mountain group around the Herzogenhorn in the Black Forest in the southwest German state of Baden-Württemberg. It lies about 4 kilometres east of the town of  Todtnau.

Location and topography 

The central highlands of the Southern Black Forest are formed by the Feldberg region in the north and the group of mountains around the Herzogenhorn in the south, both separated by the Feldberg Pass and the deep valley of Trogtal through which the upper Wiese runs. The rocky dome of the Silberberg drops steeply to the north by a good 550 metres forming one of the highest mountain faces in the Feldberg region. To the southeast the mountain is bounded by the upper reaches of the Prägbach. The latter runs parallel to the Wiese, but 400 metres above it, the southeastern mountainside descending only relatively gently. It transitions to the high pastures of the upper Prägbach valley. The forested northern mountainside is divided by cirque-like niches and craggy ridges that are like arêtes in places.

Rocks and minerals 
The Silberberg, like the whole upper Wiese valley is mostly made of paragneisses. Also present here, are several vein-line porphyry deposits, which were probably formed towards the end of the Variscan mountain building phase, and amphibolite. Both are very resistant to weathering and tend, therefore, to form crags.
A number of mineral lodes run through the Silberberg with a total length of several kilometres and of medium thickness up to 1.2 metres. In the quartz, fluorspar, baryte, calcite and dolomite veins are galena, chalcopyrite and silver ores. The Silberberg is also the only place in the Black Forest to date where tremolite has been found.

Mining 
The name of the mountain recalls the silver mining of bygone years. It is part of the Todtnau mining region, in which silver was mined as early as the Middle Ages. The oldest record of ore mines on the Silberberg dates to 1028. In the western, neighbouring cirque of Zimmerwinkel the Dr. Tholus Brunnen gallery was worked by the Gewerkschaft Finstergrund from 1968 until 1970 in order to extract fluorite and baryte.

Tourism 
A rock path runs up the steep, northern slopes of the Silberberg that was originally blazed by the Black Forest Club but, like the Alpine Path on the Feldberg has been abandoned. The very varied footpath has a few exposed sections but is still passible.

References 

One-thousanders of Germany
Ski areas and resorts in Germany
Mountains and hills of Baden-Württemberg
Mountains and hills of the Black Forest